Sikkim Government College, Gyalshing West Sikkim is a co-educational Degree College established in 2011. It is affiliated to Sikkim University since 2012.

Courses offered
The college offers B.A. Degree Courses (Honours & General) in English, Nepali, Limboo, Bhutia, Lepcha, Geography, History, Political Science, Sociology, Economics, Physical Education, Education and Tourism. B.Com, B.Sc and other Professional Courses will also be introduced in near future. The college has a teacher-student ratio of 1:18.

Academic sessions
The Academic session of College is from July to December for Odd Semester and February to May for Even Semester.

Location
It has an average elevation of 823 metres (2700 feet).

References

Educational institutions established in 2011
Colleges affiliated to Sikkim University
2011 establishments in Sikkim